Pribovce is a village in the municipality of Bujanovac, Serbia. According to the 2002 census, the town has a population of 348 people. Of these, 346 (99,42 %) were ethnic Albanians, 1 (0,28 %) Romanian, and 1 (0,28 %) Muslim.

References

Populated places in Pčinja District
Albanian communities in Serbia